Stars of the Lid is an American ambient music duo consisting of Brian McBride and Adam Wiltzie. The duo formed in Austin, Texas in 1993. They have been acclaimed for their music incorporating droning, effects-treated guitars along with piano, strings, and horns, described as "divine, classical drone without the tedious intrusion of drums or vocals."

History 
Formed in Austin, Texas in 1993, Stars of the Lid is composed of two members: Brian McBride and Adam Wiltzie. McBride said in an interview that the band's name refers to "your own personal cinema, located between your eye and eyelid", suggesting the colors and patterns one can see with closed eyes (either phosphenes or closed-eye hallucinations). They listed among their influences minimalist and electronic composers such as Arvo Pärt, Zbigniew Preisner, Gavin Bryars, Henryk Górecki and Brian Eno, as well as post-rock artists Talk Talk and Labradford. They recorded their debut album Music for Nitrous Oxide throughout 1993 and 1994 with third musician Kirk Laktas, and released the album in 1995 on the Sedimental label. Laktas did not continue with the group, and the duo of McBride and Wiltzie steadily continued with Gravitational Pull vs. the Desire for an Aquatic Life in 1996, The Ballasted Orchestra in 1997, Per Aspera Ad Astra in 1998, and Avec Laudenum in 1999, as well as the limited edition EP Maneuvering the Nocturnal Hum and a split single with Windsor for the Derby, both in 1998.

Stars of the Lid then released their first double album, The Tired Sounds of Stars of the Lid, in late October 2001. Nearly six years later, the duo released their second double album, And Their Refinement of the Decline, in April 2007 to widespread critical acclaim. In December 2007, American webzine Somewhere Cold voted Stars of the Lid Artist of the Year on their 2007 Somewhere Cold Awards Hall of Fame.

Stars of the Lid toured worldwide throughout 2007 and 2008 in support of the album; throughout their European tour, they were joined live by a string trio featuring Lucinda Chua of Felix on cello, Noura Sanatian on violin, and Ela Baruch on viola. Their North American line-up included Julia Kent on cello.

The duo have been active pursuing side-projects and solo releases since And Their Refinement of the Decline. A teaser trailer for a possible Stars of the Lid feature film surfaced on the internet in 2008, but the group has yet to release any new material.

Solo and side-projects 
Brian McBride and Adam Wiltzie have both released material outside of Stars of the Lid. McBride released his first solo album When the Detail Lost Its Freedom in November 2005, then released The Effective Disconnect in October 2010, which serves as a soundtrack to the documentary Vanishing of the Bees, a film about colony collapse disorder. McBride teamed up with musician Kenneth James Gibson and began recording and releasing new music under the name Bell Gardens; their debut EP Hangups Need Company was released in May 2010, their first full-length album Full Sundown Assembly followed in November 2012, and their second album Slow Dawns for Lost Conclusions was released in October 2014 via Rocket Girl.

Wiltzie has been involved in several collaborative projects: The Dead Texan (with visual artist Christina Vantzou), Aix Em Klemm (with Robert Donne from Labradford), and A Winged Victory for the Sullen (with composer Dustin O'Halloran). Wiltzie currently lives in Brussels, Belgium, and McBride in Los Angeles, California.

Discography 

Albums
 1995: Music for Nitrous Oxide
 1996: Gravitational Pull vs. the Desire for an Aquatic Life
 1997: The Ballasted Orchestra
 1998: Per Aspera Ad Astra
 1999: Avec Laudenum
 2001: The Tired Sounds of Stars of the Lid
 2007: And Their Refinement of the Decline

Others:
 1998: Maneuvering the Nocturnal Hum (EP)
 2007: Carte-de-Visite (1997–2007 outtakes)

Split releases
 1997: The Kahanek Incident, Vol. 3 (12" with Labradford) (Trance Syndicate) – SOTL track reissued on 2007's Carte-de-Visite
 1998: Split (7" with Windsor for the Derby) (33 Degrees)

Compilation appearances
 1996: Monsters, Robots and Bug Men – "Goodnight" (Virgin)
 2002: Brain in the Wire – "Requiem for Dying Mothers (Version i, Zamachowski op. 87)" (Brainwashed)
 2003: 1993–2003: 1st Decade in the Machines – "I Love You, But I Prefer Trondheim" (Jester)
 2004: Kompilation – "Even If You're Never Awake (Version)" (Kranky)
 2008: Brainwaves 2008 – "May 2nd 2008 (Live in NYC)" (Brainwashed)

References

External links 
  at Brainwashed
 Stars of the Lid at MySpace
 Stars of the Lid at Kranky (biography, discography)
  (biography, discography)
 Stars of the Lid at Epitonic Records (tracks, brief biography)
 Stars of the Lid at Vimeo (teaser for an upcoming SOTL feature film)

American ambient music groups
Musical groups from Austin, Texas
Musical groups established in 1993
Trance Syndicate artists
Drone music groups
Electronic music groups from Texas